Laurus is a genus of evergreen trees or shrubs belonging to the laurel family, Lauraceae. The genus contains three or more species, including the bay laurel or sweet bay, L. nobilis, widely cultivated as an ornamental plant and a culinary herb.

Description
They are slow-growing, large, evergreen aromatic shrubs or trees with alternate, ovate leaves and insignificant yellow male and female flowers borne on separate plants (dioecious). They are frost-hardy but in temperate zones they require a sheltered spot in full sun that is not subject to prolonged freezing. Plants in pots can be moved into a cold greenhouse during the winter months.

Species
The number of species in the genus has not yet been fully resolved. The following may or may not be included.

Laurus azorica, Azores laurel, is native to the Azores.
Laurus nobilis, bay Laurel, true laurel, sweet bay, is used as an ornamental plant and culinary herb (one type of bay leaf) used in Mediterranean style dishes. It was also the original source of the laurel wreath of ancient Greece. It is native to the Mediterranean region.
Laurus novocanariensis, formerly included in L. azorica, native to Madeira and the Canary Islands.

Fossil history

Fossils dating from before the Pleistocene glaciations show that species of Laurus were formerly distributed more widely around the Mediterranean and North Africa, when the climate was more humid and mild than at present. It is currently thought that the drying of the Mediterranean basin during the glaciations caused Laurus to retreat to the mildest climate refuges, including southern Spain, Portugal and the Macaronesian islands. With the end of the last glacial period, L. nobilis recovered some of its former range around the Mediterranean.

References

Further reading
Arroyo-García, R., Martínez-Zapater, J.M., Fernández Prieto, J.A., & Álvarez-Arbesú R. (2001). AFLP evaluation of genetic similarity among laurel populations. Euphytica 122 (1): 155-164.
Barbero, M., Benabid, A., Peyre, C. & Quezel, P. (1981). Sur la presence au Maroc de Laurus azorica (Seub.) Franco. Anales Jard. Bot. Madrid 37 (2): 467-472. Available online (pdf file; in French).
Costa, J. C., Capelo, J., Jardim, R., Sequeira, M., (2004). Catálogo Florístico do Arquipélago da Madeira. Quercetea 6, 187-200.
Mabberley, D.J (1997). The Plant Book: a Portable Dictionary of the Vascular Plants. Second edition, pp. 393–394.

External links
 Photos of L. azorica

Lauraceae genera
Taxa named by Carl Linnaeus
Dioecious plants
Lauraceae